No Commercial Potential was the debut studio album of Djam Karet, released in 1985 by HC Productions.

Track listing

Personnel
Adapted from No Commercial Potential liner notes.

Djam Karet
Gayle Ellett – guitar
Mike Henderson – guitar
Chuck Oken – drums
Henry J. Osborne – bass guitar

Production and additional personnel
Rychard Cooper – mastering, recording
Djam Karet – mastering
Loren Nerell – recording

Release history

References

External links 
 
 No Commercial Potential at Bandcamp

1985 debut albums
Djam Karet albums